The Vestmarka Line is an abandoned railway between Skotterud and Vestmarka in Eidskog, Norway. The line was 14.3 kilometers long and opened on 15 October 1918. The line was the first railway in Norway to close to passengers, on 3 January 1931. Freight transport between Buåa and Vestmarka was terminated on 15 February 1961 and the line completely terminated on 1 June 1965.

External links
Jernbane.net about Vestmarkabanen 

Railway lines in Innlandet
Railway lines opened in 1918
1918 establishments in Norway